The twenty-first edition of the Caribbean Series (Serie del Caribe) was played in . It was held from February 4 through February 9 with the champions teams from the Dominican Republic, Águilas Cibaeñas; Mexico, Tomateros de Culiacán; Puerto Rico, Indios de Mayagüez and Venezuela, Leones del Caracas. The format consisted of 12 games, each team facing the other teams twice, and the games were played at Estadio Teodoro Mariscal in Mazatlán, México.

Summary

Scoreboards

Game 1, February 4

Game 2, February 4

Game 3, February 5

Game 4, February 5

Game 5, February 6

Game 6, February 6

Game 7, February 7

Game 8, February 7

Game 9, February 8

Game 10, February 8

Game 11, February 9

Game 12, February 9

See also
Ballplayers who have played in the Series

Sources
Antero Núñez, José. Series del Caribe. Impresos Urbina, Caracas, Venezuela.
Araujo Bojórquez, Alfonso. Series del Caribe: Narraciones y estadísticas, 1949-2001. Colegio de Bachilleres del Estado de Sinaloa, Mexico.
Figueredo, Jorge S. Cuban Baseball: A Statistical History, 1878–1961. Macfarland & Co., United States.
González Echevarría, Roberto. The Pride of Havana. Oxford University Express.
Gutiérrez, Daniel. Enciclopedia del Béisbol en Venezuela, Caracas, Venezuela.

See also
Ballplayers who have played in the Series

External links
Las Series del Caribe (Spanish)
1978 Caribbean Series statistics

Caribbean
Caribbean Series
International baseball competitions hosted by Mexico
1978 in Mexican sports
1978 in Caribbean sport
Caribbean Series